Amvrakia Kostakioi F.C. was a Greek football club, based in Kostakioi, Arta.

Honors

Domestic Titles and honors
 Eps Epirus Champions: 1
 1965-66
 Eps Arta Champions: 2
 1986-87, 2015–16
 Eps Arta Cup Winners: 1
 1996-97

Arta (regional unit)
Association football clubs established in 1953
1953 establishments in Greece
Gamma Ethniki clubs

Football clubs in Epirus